The Hoch Horefellistock is a mountain of the Urner Alps, overlooking the Göschenertal in the canton of Uri. On its southern side lies the Göscheneralpsee.

References

External links
 Hoch Horefellistock on Hikr

Mountains of the Alps
Alpine three-thousanders
Mountains of Switzerland
Mountains of the canton of Uri